Angel with the Crown of Thorns is a statue by Italian artist Gian Lorenzo Bernini. Originally commissioned by Pope Clement IX for the Ponte Sant'Angelo project, the statue was replaced with a copy and the original was moved to Sant'Andrea delle Fratte in Rome, Italy. The statue was started in 1667 and completed in 1669. A terracotta modello for the sculpture is held by the musée du Louvre in Paris.

See also
 List of works by Gian Lorenzo Bernini

References

External links

1669 sculptures
Marble sculptures in Italy
Sculptures by Gian Lorenzo Bernini
Sculptures of angels